Assorus or Assoros may refer to:
 Assorus (Babylonia), a Babylonian city
 Assorus (Mygdonia), a town of ancient Mygdonia, Macedonia, Greece
 Assorus (Sicily), a city of the Sicel in Sicily, later Hellenised as Assoros and now Assoro